Eagle Ridge may refer to:

Places
Eagle Ridge, Calgary, a neighborhood in Calgary, Alberta
Eagle Ridge (Coquitlam), a neighborhood in Coquitlam, British Columbia
Eagle Ridge (Omaha), a neighborhood near Papillion in the Omaha metropolitan area in Nebraska

Schools
Eagle Ridge Junior High School, a school in Savage, Minnesota
Eagle Ridge Middle School, a school in Loudoun County, Virginia
Eagle Ridge Elementary School, a school in Coquitlam, British Columbia

Other
Eagle Ridge Golf Club (disambiguation), one of a number of golf courses in the United States
Eagle Ridge Hospital, a hospital in Coquitlam, British Columbia
A commonly used alternate name for Eagle Mountain, located near Coquitlam, British Columbia.